Khaled Khalaila (born 16 December 1982) is an Arab-Israeli footballer who last  played for Maccabi Tamra in Liga Alef.

See also
List of one-club men

References

1982 births
Living people
Israeli footballers
Arab-Israeli footballers
Arab citizens of Israel
Bnei Sakhnin F.C. players
Maccabi Ironi Tamra F.C. players
Liga Leumit players
Israeli Premier League players
Footballers from Sakhnin
Association football midfielders